The Chain Lakes Bridge is a historic structure located southeast of Palo, Iowa, United States. The Linn County Board of Supervisors began planning for this span in the early 1880s. They appropriated $20,000 for this two-span Pratt through truss The Wrought Iron Bridge Company of Canton, Ohio, which built bridges in the county since 1879, completed this structure in 1884. The bridge was listed on the National Register of Historic Places in 1998. While it was built to carry vehicular traffic, it is now in a nature preserve maintained by the Linn County Conservation Board.

See also
 
 
 
 
 List of bridges on the National Register of Historic Places in Iowa
 National Register of Historic Places listings in Linn County, Iowa

References

Bridges completed in 1884
Truss bridges in Iowa
Bridges in Linn County, Iowa
National Register of Historic Places in Linn County, Iowa
Road bridges on the National Register of Historic Places in Iowa
Wrought iron bridges in the United States
Pratt truss bridges in the United States